Vicious Circle is a 2008 drama film written and directed by Paul Boyd and starring Paul Rodriguez Jr., Emily Rios, and Trevor Wright.

Plot
Set on the streets of modern-day Venice Beach, Vicious Circle is a tragic punk rock Latino love story; a raw, edgy, teenage Romeo and Juliet with a murder mystery twist. We first see 18-year-old RJ (skateboard star, Paul Rodriguez Jr.) running through the streets of LA with a blood stained shirt and a gun in his backpack, leaving us to wonder, "What happened?" An artist and skater with a heart of gold, R.J. dreams of moving to New York City to pursue his dream of creating comic books. His hand-made sketchbook demonstrates his unique talent and acts as a portal between fantasy and reality. A strong influence of the game of chess from RJ's incarcerated father permeates his art and life; RJ lives by the rules of the game and knows the repercussions of one bad move. Soon, RJ meets Angel (Emily Rios), a rebellious singer in a local teenage punk band. Their unexpected story of true love causes the tides to turn in both lives, and RJ reveals a secret that could cost the life of his new love.

Cast

 Paul Rodriguez Jr. as R.J.
 Emily Rios as Angel
 Trevor Wright as Fin
 Robert Zepeda as Smiler Sanchez
 Richard Edson as John
 Idalis DeLeón as Helena
 Perrey Reeves as Sgt. Berger
 Cody McMains as Alfred
 Clifton Powell as Freddy
 Paul Rodriguez Sr. as Professor
 Angelyna Martinez as CeCe Sanchez
 Drew Osborne as Young Fin
 Mike Diaz as Sgt. Gomez
 Magdaleno "Guic One" Robles Jr as friend of Smiler

Soundtrack

Release
Vicious Circle made its premiere at the 9th Annual New York International Latino Film Festival on July 25, 2008 at the Director's Guild Theatre. The film won Best Picture at 2008 HBO New York International Latino Film Festival. Vicious Circle also won the Audience Award at the 2008 Orlando International Film Festival and was an Official Selection at the 2009 Downtown Film Festival in Los Angeles.

Vicious Circle signed a distribution deal with Maya Entertainment in 2009.

Awards

External links
 

2008 films
2000s English-language films
2008 drama films
American independent films
Films set in California
Films based on Romeo and Juliet
American drama films
2008 independent films
2000s American films